The Australian Communications Consumer Action Network (ACCAN) is the peak advocacy group for Australian communications consumers. It receives Australian government funding to carry out its work, part of which ACCAN distributes to researchers.

Government funding
ACCAN is funded by the Commonwealth of Australia under section 593 of the Telecommunications Act 1997. This funding is recovered from a levy on telecommunications carriers.

Campaigns 
ACCAN has campaigned for a government scheme to monitor NBN broadband performance. The Australian Competition and Consumer Commission (ACCC) is in the process of setting up such a scheme. It has selected SamKnows to operate the NBN testing system.

After a surge in customer complaints to the Telecommunications Industry Ombudsman (TIO) in late 2017, ACCAN called for improved consumer protections.

References

External links 
 Official website

Telecommunications in Australia